Coleophora berbera is a moth of the family Coleophoridae. It is found in Spain and North Africa.

References

berbera
Moths described in 1988
Moths of Europe
Moths of Africa